The 1987 Clemson Tigers football team was an American football team that represented Clemson University in the Atlantic Coast Conference (ACC) during the 1987 NCAA Division I-A football season. In its tenth season under head coach Danny Ford, the team compiled a 10–2 record (6–1 against conference opponents), won the ACC championship, defeated Penn State in the 1988 Florida Citrus Bowl, was ranked No. 12 in the final AP Poll, and outscored opponents by a total of 333 to 176. The team played its home games at Memorial Stadium in Clemson, South Carolina.

Michael Dean Perry and John Phillips were the team captains. The team's statistical leaders included quarterback Rodney Williams with 1,486 passing yards, Terry Allen with 973 rushing yards, Gary Cooper with 618 receiving yards, and placekicker David Treadwell with 87 points scored (18 field goals, 33 extra points).

Schedule

Personnel

Game summaries

at Virginia Tech

Maryland

at South Carolina

Penn State (Florida Citrus Bowl)

Rankings

References

Clemson
Clemson Tigers football seasons
Atlantic Coast Conference football champion seasons
Citrus Bowl champion seasons
Clemson Tigers football